Yariguíes National Park (Spanish: Serranía de los Yariguíes) is a natural park in north central Colombia. It is located in the Santander department and measures . It was officially designated as a national natural park in 2005.

See also
 Cerulean Warbler Bird Reserve
 List of national parks of Colombia

References

External links
 Bird species of Yariguíes National Park

Páramos
Mountain ranges of Colombia
National parks of Colombia
Geography of Santander Department
Protected areas established in 2005